The Tehachapi Pass wind farm is one of the first large-scale wind farms installed in the U.S., with around  produced by about 3400 wind turbines.

Overview
The mountain pass acts as a venturi effect to air moving between ocean and desert, increasing wind speed.

Wind development in the Tehachapi Pass began in the early 1980s by James Dehlsen and Zond Corporation. The first set of wind turbines installed were of American-made Storm Master brand, however they proved troublesome and eventually had to be replaced. Dehlsen turned to Danish-built machines later, which now make up the majority of the turbines at the pass. The area hosts a multitude of wind farms, comprising one of California's largest wind resource areas. The pass is undergoing much repowering activity. The area has multiple generations of wind turbine technology installed, including both single and double-blade turbines, as well as the more modern three-blade horizontal axis design.  The older generation turbines generate kilowatts, and the modern turbines installed generate up to 3 megawatts, depending on the specific turbine and manufacturer. 

The Tehachapi Wind Resource Area is a net exporter of generation to other parts of the state of California. A state initiative to upgrade the transmission out of Tehachapi (the 4.5 GW Tehachapi Renewable Transmission Project) began in 2008 and was completed by 2016. This has opened the door to further regional wind power development up to 10 GW, and multiple solar and storage projects are expected to be installed to utilize that capacity.  A prime location for viewing the turbines is off of State Route 58 and from Tehachapi-Willow Springs Road.

Further development
One proponent for further regional wind power development is Southern California Edison, which executed power purchase agreements for up to 1,500 megawatts (MW) or more of power generated from new projects to be built in the Tehachapi area, of which the Alta Wind Energy Center was developed.

Other well-known wind turbine locations in California include the adjacent Alta Wind Energy Center, the Altamont Pass Wind Farm and the San Gorgonio Pass Wind Farm, near Palm Springs.

See also 

 Tehachapi Wind Resource Area
 Wind power in the United States
 Wind power in California

References

External links

Presscom.com: Wind Farms (power plants) in Tehachapi, California
Renewableenergyworld.com: "Another Wind Farm for Tehachapi Pass"

Wind farms in California
Buildings and structures in Kern County, California
Tehachapi Mountains
Companies based in Riverside County, California